The National Economic Association (NEA) is a learned society established in 1969, focused on initiatives in the field of economics. 

The purposes of the Association are "to promote the professional lives of minorities within the profession. In addition to continuing its founding mission, the organization is particularly interested in producing and distributing knowledge of economic issues that are of exceptional interest to promoting economic growth among native and immigrant African Americans, Latinos, and other people of color." Membership in the Association is available to professionals and graduate students in Economics and related disciplines. The NEA publishes the Review of Black Political Economy and regularly collaborates with the Allied Social Science Associations, American Economic Association, and American Society of Hispanic Economics.

History 
The NEA was established in 1969 as the "Caucus of Black Economists" in New York City at the annual economists' convention that year.  Its founders, Charles Wilson and Marcus Alexis, with Thaddeus Spratlen, began "an organized effort to challenge the American Economic Association (AEA) to engage in strategies that increase opportunities for black economists’ development." They were successful in persuading the AEA to establish a Committee on the Status of Minority Groups in the Economics Profession (CSMGEP) and to sponsor a summer program that helps undergraduates of color prepare for graduate school admission.

Founder Bernard Anderson of the Wharton School of Business said that when the group first met, the leaders of the American Economic Association called the police. "They thought we were a bunch of radicals who wanted to disrupt the convention,” Mr. Anderson said, “when all we wanted to be was economists.”

In 1975, the group was reorganized as the "National Economic Association" to focus on initiatives independent of the CSMGEP, particularly awarding recognition to Black economics for their accomplishments in the economics profession.

Activities 
The annual meetings of the NEA are held in conjunction with the annual Allied Social Science Associations (ASSA) meetings each January, and include multiple panels of research presentations.  In addition, the NEA collaborates with the American Society of Hispanic Economics to host a summer conference on the subject of economic problems and potential solutions for Black and Hispanic communities, as well as racial and ethnic economic disparities and policies designed to counter these disparities.

Since 1977, the NEA has published The Review of Black Political Economy, a journal focusing on "research that examines issues related to the economic status of African-Americans, the African diaspora, and marginalized populations throughout the world."

The Association periodically awards the Westerfield Award in acknowledgement of outstanding scholarly achievements and public service by an African-American economist. This award, established in 1973, was named after economist and ambassador Samuel Z. Westerfield Jr.  The association also awards the Rhonda Williams Dissertation Award to junior scholars, named after multidisciplinary scholar Rhonda M. Williams.

Since 2008, the NEA has collaborated with the American Economic Association's Committee on the Status of Minority Groups in the Economics Profession (AEA-CSMGEP) and the American Society of Hispanic Economists (ASHE)  to publish an annual newsletter, "Minority Report," which "showcases the people, programs, research, and activities of the three groups, which together help to increase the representation of minorities in the economics profession." There is a great deal of overlap in the leadership of the NEA and the AEA-CSMGEP, but they are separate organizations.

Westerfield Award recipients
The Samuel Z. Westerfield Award is occasionally presented to black economists "in recognition of their distinguished service, outstanding scholarship, and achievement of high standards of excellence." 

Past recipients of the Award:

 2021 James B. Stewart
 2018 Cecilia A Conrad
 2015 Samuel Myers, Jr
 2012 William A. Darity, Jr.
 2008 Margaret Simms
 2006 David Swinton
 2003 Bernard E. Anderson
 1995 Samuel L. Myers, Sr.
 1990 Andrew F. Brimmer
 1986 Clifton R. Wharton, Jr
 1982 Phyllis A. Wallace
 1979 Marcus A. Alexis
 1975 Sir W. Arthur Lewis
 1973 Samuel Z. Westerfield Jr (posthumous)

Association presidents 
Presidents of the association:

 2023 Angelino Viceisza
 2022 Valerie Rawlston Wilson
 2021 Nina Banks
 2020 Linwood Tauheed
 2019 Omari Swinton
 2018 Olugbenga Ajilore
 2017 Rhonda Vonshay Sharpe
 2016 Darrick Hamilton
 2015 Lisa Cook
 2014 Trevon Logan
 2013 Warren Whatley
 2012 Jessica Gordon Nembhard
 2011 Juliet Elu
 2010 Susan Williams McElroy
 2009 Peter Blair Henry
 2008 James Peoples
 2007 Gregory Price
 2006 Kwabena Gyimah-Brempong
 2005 Philip Jefferson
 2004 Sheila Ards
 2003 William Rodgers
 2002 Patrick Mason
 2001 Kaye Husbands Fealing
 2000 William Spriggs
 1999 Willene Johnson
 1998 Gwendolyn Flowers
 1997 Agustin K. Fosu
 1996 Shelley White-Means
 1995 Alvin E. Headen
 1994 James B. Stewart
 1993 Cecilia A. Conrad
 1992 Arthur T. King
 1991 Charles L. Betsey
 1990 Thomas D. Boston
 1989 Stephanie Y. Wilson
 1988 Samuel Myers, Jr
 1987 Barbara A. P. Jones
 1986 William A. Darity, Jr.
 1985 Richard F. America, Jr
 1984 William D. Bradford
 1983 David Swinton
 1982 Bernard E. Anderson
 1981 Alfred E. Osborne
 1980 Vincent R. McDonald
 1979 Margaret Simms
 1978 Flournoy A. Coles
 1977 Huey J. Battle
 1976 Alfred L. Edwards
 1975 Edward D. Irons
 1974 Robert C. Vowels
 1973 Karl D. Gregory
 1972 Charles Z. Wilson
 1970-1971 Marcus Alexis

See also 
 American Economic Association

References 

1969 establishments in New York City
1969 in economics
Professional associations based in the United States
Business and finance professional associations
Economics societies
Learned societies of the United States
Organizations established in 1969